Robin Simović (born 29 May 1991) is a Swedish footballer of Croatian descent, who plays as a forward for Jeonnam Dragons.

Career
Simović spent most of his youth playing for Malmö FF where he scored a total of 377 goals in 337 games for the various youth teams at the club. When his contract with Malmö expired at the end of 2010 the club instead preferred to move Dardan Rexhepi up into the first team and Simovic left for fourth tier club IFK Klagshamn. After a successful year in Klagshamn he was signed by Superettan side Ängelholms FF.

At Ängelholm he became the second best goalscorer in the 2012 Superettan and was signed after the season by nearby Allsvenskan club Helsingborgs IF on a 3.5 year deal.

On 10 December 2015, Simović was confirmed along with country-man Ludvig Öhman to be joining Nagoya Grampus for the 2016 J-League season.

On 27 February 2016, Simovic scored on his debut for Nagoya in a 1–0 away win against Jubilo Iwata. He scored his second goal in as many matches in his home debut in a 1–1 draw against defending champions Sanfrecce Hiroshima.

On 10 January 2018, Omiya Ardija announced the signing of Simovic.

On 12 February 2020 he signed for Livorno.

On 31 August 2020, he moved to Odd in Norway. He left the club at the end of the year. On 16 February 2021, Simović joined Varbergs BoIS.

Career statistics
.

References

External links

Profile at Nagoya Grampus
Profile at Omiya Ardija

Elite Prospects profile

1991 births
Living people
Swedish people of Croatian descent
Swedish footballers
Swedish expatriate footballers
Association football forwards
Lunds BK players
Ängelholms FF players
Helsingborgs IF players
U.S. Livorno 1915 players
Nagoya Grampus players
Omiya Ardija players
Odds BK players
Varbergs BoIS players
Superettan players
Allsvenskan players
Ettan Fotboll players
Division 2 (Swedish football) players
Serie B players
J1 League players
J2 League players
Eliteserien players
Footballers from Malmö
Swedish expatriate sportspeople in Japan
Swedish expatriate sportspeople in Italy
Swedish expatriate sportspeople in Norway
Expatriate footballers in Japan
Expatriate footballers in Italy
Expatriate footballers in Norway